Seven Group Holdings Limited (SGH, formerly Seven Network Limited) is an Australian diversified operating and investment group in the media, mining and construction industries.

History 
Seven Network Limited was formed in 1991 by receivers to bundle together the assets of Christopher Skase's failed Qintex business.

In 2002, Seven Media Group acquired Pacific Magazines. In January 2006, Seven Media Group partnered with Yahoo! to launch Yahoo!7, founded as a cross-media entity which would expand the content distribution networks of both companies.

In December 2006, Seven Network Limited shareholders voted to spin off the company's 'old media' assets into a 50/50 joint venture with private equity firm Kohlberg Kravis Roberts, creating the Seven Media Group.

In January 2008, Kerry Stokes' National Hire Group took over alongside private investors The Carlyle Group the equipment rental company Coates, de-listing it from the Australian Securities Exchange. The hire businesses of Coates and National Hire were merged to consolidate the two largest hire companies in Australia, creating Coates Hire.

On 22 February 2010, it was announced that WesTrac, owned by Australian Capital Equity, Kerry Stokes's investment firm, would merge with Seven Network Limited, and the combined entity was renamed "Seven Group Holdings".

On 25 October 2017, SGH acquired the remaining 53% from The Carlyle Group as well as from other minority owners for $517 million. SGH had first invested in Coates Hire, alongside The Carlyle Group and exiting management in 2008 through its WesTrac subsidiary.

In April 2011, Seven Media Group was acquired by West Australian Newspapers to create Seven West Media. Seven Group Holdings remains Seven West Media's largest shareholder, with a 33% stake. As of July 2021, this stood at 40%. In July 2021, Seven Group Holdings took majority ownership in Boral.

References

External links
Seven Group Holdings

Companies based in Sydney
Companies listed on the Australian Securities Exchange
Holding companies of Australia
Holding companies established in 1956
Mass media companies established in 1956
Mass media companies of Australia
Mining companies of Australia
Seven Network
Australian companies established in 1956